Konoin Constituency is an electoral constituency in Bomet County, Kenya. It is one of five constituencies in Bomet County and was one of three constituencies of the former Buret District. The constituency has seven wards, all electing councillors for the Bureti County Council. The constituency was established for the 1988 elections.

Members of Parliament

Wards

See also 

 Bomet Central Constituency
 Chepalungu Constituency
 Sotik Constituency
 Bomet East Constituency

References 

Buret District
Constituencies in Bomet County
Constituencies in Rift Valley Province
1988 establishments in Kenya
Constituencies established in 1988